Kangraur is a village in Shaheed Bhagat Singh Nagar district of Punjab State, India. The village is administrated by Sarpanch an elected representative of the village.

Demography 
As of 2011, Kangraur has a total number of 330 houses and population of 1695 of which 867 include are males while 828 are females according to the report published by Census India in 2011. The literacy rate of Kangraur is 82.96%, higher than the state average of 75.84%. The population of children under the age of 6 years is 193 which is 11.39% of total population of Kangraur, and child sex ratio is approximately 636 as compared to Punjab state average of 846.

Most of the people are from Schedule Caste which constitutes 36.58% of total population in Kangraur. The town does not have any Schedule Tribe population so far.

As per the report published by Census India in 2011, 504 people were engaged in work activities out of the total population of Kangraur which includes 469 males and 35 females. According to census survey report 2011, 91.47% workers describe their work as main work and 8.53% workers are involved in Marginal activity providing livelihood for less than 6 months.

Education 
The village has a Punjabi medium, co-ed upper primary with secondary school established in 1981. The school provide mid-day meal as per Indian Midday Meal Scheme. As per Right of Children to Free and Compulsory Education Act the school provide free education to children between the ages of 6 and 14.

Amardeep Singh Shergill Memorial college Mukandpur and Sikh National College Banga are the nearest colleges.

List of schools nearby:
Dashmesh Model School, Kahma
Govt High School, Jhander Kalan
Govt High School, Khan Khana
Guru Teg Bahadur Model School, Behram
Guru Ram Dass Public School, Cheta
Lovely Public School, Pathlawa

Transport 

See also 
List of villages in India

References

External links 
 Tourism of Punjab
 Census of Punjab
 Locality Based PINCode

Villages in Shaheed Bhagat Singh Nagar district